James Astbury Hammersley (1815–1869) was an English painter, and a teacher of art and design.

Life
Hammersley was born at Burslem, Staffordshire, and studied art under James Baker Pyne. During the 1840s he taught at the Nottingham School of Design, where his pupils included Henry Hunter and Andrew MacCallum.

From May 1849 until 31 December 1862 Hammersley was head-master of the Manchester School of Design. He took part in the formation of the Manchester Academy of Fine Arts, being elected its first president, 28 May 1857. He resigned the post on 30 December 1861.

Hammersley died at Manchester in 1869, and was buried at St. John's Church, Higher Broughton.

Works

Hammersley received a commission, from Albert, Prince Consort, to paint the prince's birthplace, Schloss Rosenau, Coburg, and another scene in Germany. These works are now in the Royal Collection at Windsor Castle.

In 1850 Hammersley delivered an address at Nottingham on the Preparations on the Continent for the Great Exhibition of 1851, and the Condition of the Continental Schools of Art; it was published. An article by him appeared in Manchester Papers, 1856, entitled "Exhibition of Art Treasures of the United Kingdom", anticipating the Manchester exhibition.
 In 1845, Mrs Charles Darwin noted in her diary "send the X head to Mr J.A. Hammersley.

References

External links

Attribution

1815 births
1869 deaths
English landscape painters
People from Burslem
19th-century English educators
19th-century British painters